Pollenia viridiventris is a species of cluster fly in the family Polleniidae.

Distribution
Australia.

References

Polleniidae
Insects described in 1847
Diptera of Australasia